Pandebjerg is a manor house on the island of Falster in southeastern Denmark. It has been owned by members of the Tesdorpf family since 1878. The current main building is from 1900.

History
Pandebjerg was established when Peder Estrup divided his recently acquired estate Kirstineberg in two. Both estates were passed on to his brother Jacob Brønnum Scavenius Estrup after Peder Estrup's death in 1848. J. B. S. Estrup, who would later serve as Prime Minister of Denmark]], sold the estates to Therman Ø. Hillerup after a few years. Kirstineberg was renamed Gammel Kirstineberg ("Old Kirstinebjerg") after the western part of its land was transferred to a new farm called Ny Kirstineberg ("New Kirstineberg").

Pandebjerg was after Therman Ø. Hillerup's death in 1854 sold to H. Wilhjelm while Gammel Kirstineberg remained in the Hillerup family.

Tesdorpf family
Edward Tesdorpf, on e of the largest landowners in the area, acquired the estate in 1878. Originally from Hamburg, he had come to Denmark in 1940 where he initially acquired Orupgaard and later expanded his holdings through the purchase of several other estates. His son, Adolph Tesdorpf, who inherited Pandebjerg in 1889, acquired Ny Kirstineberg in 1908. Both estates have remained in the hands of the Tesdorpf family since then.

Architecture
The current main building is from 1900 and was built to design by the architect Henrik Christopher Glahn.

Architecture
The main building is designed with inspiration from early Renaissance architecture.

Today
The Pandebjerg estate (with the farms Axelborg and Nygård) has a total  area of 816 hectares. Farmland covers 625 hectares that are managed in collaboration with Ny Kirstineberg, Gammel Kirstineberg and Klodskovgaard. The estate is also involved in fruit production through the company Guldborgsund Grugt. Ny Kirstineberg Skov, a woodland area, is 175 hectares. The estate is also used for hunting and other events.

List of owners
 (1847-1848) Peder Estrup
 (1848-1851) Jacob Brønnum Scavenius Estrup
 (1851-1854) Therman F. Ø. Hillerup
 (1854-1872) H. Wilhjelm
 (1872-1878) Forp. Petersen
 (1878-1889) Edward Tesdorpf
 (1889-1929) Adolph Valdemar Tesdorpf
 (1929-1940) Agnes Carlsdatter Brun née Tesdorpf
 (1940-1964) Axel Valdemar Tesdorpf
 (1964-2002) Anne Dorothea Axelsdatter Tesdorpf gift Castenschiold
 (2002-2007) Anne Dorothea Axelsdatter Tesdorpf gift Castenschiold / Axel
 Christian Tesdorpf Castenschiold
 (2007-) Axel Christian Tesdorpf Castenschiold

References

External links
 Official website
 Pandebjerg and Ny Kirstineberg at Guldborgsund Frugt

Manor houses in Guldborgsund Municipality
Houses completed in 1900
Buildings and structures associated with the Estrup family
Buildings and structures associated with the Tesdorpf family
Buildings and structures associated with the Castenschiold family